Mark Allan Isherwood (born 21 January 1959) is a  Welsh Conservative Party politician, who has served as a Member of the Senedd (MS) for the North Wales region since 2003.  He is the son of Liberal Democrat politician Rodney Isherwood.

Education
Isherwood attended Stockport Grammar School. He graduated with a Politics degree from the University of Newcastle upon Tyne.

Professional career
Associate of the Chartered Institute of Bankers and was North Wales Area Manager for Cheshire Building Society. School Governor. Board Member of Flintshire Housing Association.

Political career
Community Councillor (1999–2004).

References

External links
Mark Isherwood MS Website
Welsh Conservatives Website
Mark Isherwood profile at the site of the Welsh Conservatives

Offices held

1959 births
Living people
Councillors in Wales
Conservative Party members of the Senedd
Wales AMs 2003–2007
Wales AMs 2007–2011
Wales AMs 2011–2016
Wales MSs 2016–2021
Alumni of Newcastle University
People educated at Stockport Grammar School
School governors
Conservative Party (UK) parliamentary candidates
Wales MSs 2021–2026